Naalai Namadhe is a 2009 Tamil language drama film directed by Vinayan. The film stars newcomer Pradeep, Sharwanand,  Sanusha, Karthika Mathew, Kiran Rathod and Oviya with Manivannan, Ashish Vidyarthi, Rajan P. Dev, Tanikella Bharani, M. S. Bhaskar, and Charle playing supporting roles. It was released on 10 April 2009. The film was dubbed into Malayalam as India Today and was released on 10 April 2014.

Plot

Udayappa (Ashish Vidyarthi) is a wealthy businessman who donates 1800 crores for charity purpose in his district. He requests the district collector Priya Alexander (Karthika Mathew) to entrust the job of spending the money to two slum-dwellers, Mani (Manivannan) and his adopted son Ramu (Pradeep). Udayappa instructs to use the money to build houses for slum dwellers.

One night, the drunk Raju (Sharwanand), the son of the greedy politician Mahaganapathy (Rajan P. Dev), attempts to rape Mani's adopted daughter Shanthi (Sanusha), but the prostitute Sarasu (Kiran Rathod) saves Shanthi from her aggressor. The next day, at a school function, Raju is invited as the chief guest and is shocked to see the schoolgirl Shanthi. Shanthi then gives a public speech and begs Raju to help the slum dwellers. Raju decides to become a good person, and he declares his love for her. Mahaganapathy and Ramasamy (Tanikella Bharani) are keen to usurp the money given by Udayappa, and they threaten Mani to give them the 1800 crores. Mani and Ramu then kidnap Mahaganapathy to avert the blackmail. During the abduction, Maha Ganapathy discovers Udayappa's dead body.

In the past, Udayappa was a small-time crook who forced the child Ramu to steal, and one day, he burned a hovel where 24 orphaned kids were sleeping, and all of the children died. Many years later, Udayappa became a rich businessman by wrong means. To take revenge on him, Ramu kidnapped his daughter Aishwarya (Oviya) and he blackmailed Udayappa to donate a part of his fortune to the slum dwellers. Udayappa first cooperated with them but then changed his mind.

When the election starts, Ramu decides to become an independent candidate at the election, but since he is homeless and does not have a voter ID, he cannot contest at the election. Ramu then requests the slum dwellers to vote none of the above, and NOTA gets the majority of votes. Udayappa is, in reality, alive and is sequestered by Mani. Mahaganapathy escapes from the place and orders his henchmen to kill Udayappa. Mahaganapathy then kidnaps Shanthi, and she gets brutally raped by his henchmen. Shanthi then kills Mahaganapathy and is arrested. Seven years later, Shanthi is released from jail and the current home minister, Raju, asks for her hand in marriage.

Cast

Production

Vinayan made his return to Tamil cinema after a hiatus of seven years, he had taken the title from M. G. Ramachandran's film Naalai Namadhe (1975). Kiran Rathod was set to don the role of a woman living in a slum, appearing without any makeup. Newface Pradeep and Telugu actor Sharwanand were selected to play the lead roles with debutant Sanusha playing her first lead role as an actress. Rajarathnam took care of camera works while Bharadwaj scored music for the film. The first schedule of the shoot began in May 2008.

Soundtrack

The film score and the soundtrack were composed by Bharadwaj. The soundtrack, released in 2009, features 4 tracks with lyrics written by Palani Bharathi.

Reception
The Hindu wrote that "Many characters criss cross the screen - most of them vamoose and suddenly re-emerge only to fade away again. The intention could be noble but the execution is pathetic". Sify called the film "Average" and said, "Naalai Namathe seems to be a movie with a message. The trouble is that there are quite a few messages strung together that gets garbled". Another critic stated, "'Naalai Namadhe' is a movie that begins with a purpose but eventually ends nowhere". Pavithra Srinivasan of Rediff.com rated the film 1 out of 5 and said, "It should have been en emotional roller-coaster but this flick is more akin to a road-roller". Maudgalyan of Nowrunning.com rated the film 1 out of 5 and said, "Vinayan has handed out a big disappointment as the film in nothing but a mish-mash of fights, item numbers and crass comedy".

References

2009 films
2000s Tamil-language films
Indian drama films
Films scored by Bharadwaj (composer)
Films directed by Vinayan
2009 drama films